Oğuz  is a common masculine Turkic given name. There are various theories on the meaning of "Oğuz". The most prominent explanation is that it is composed of "ok" and "z". In various modern Turkic languages and in Proto-Turkic language "ok(h)" means "arrow". Only in Proto-Turkic language, "ok" also means "clan", and/or "nation". Again, only in Proto-Turkic language, "z" is the plural suffix. In modern Turkish "z" is not the plural suffix anymore, in general. Therefore "okz" means "clans", "nations", and/or "arrows". 

Finally, "Oğuz" is used both as given names and as names of some of the Turkic clans. Oğuz Türks are the southwestern branch of Turkish clan system. "Gökoğuz" was a group of Oğuz Türks who migrated to northwest and named as Gagauz in modern times. There are also groups named as Üçoğuz (Three Oğuz), Sekizoğuz (Eight Oğuz), Dokuzoğuz (Nine Oğuz), etc. One of the earliest rulers of the Turkic people is also named "Oghuz Khan". As a given name "Oğuz" used in memory of and connotes Oghuz Khan.

Given name
 Muhammet Oǧuz Zengin, Turkish curler
 Oğuz Akbulut (born 1992), Turkish para-athlete
 Oğuz Han Aynaoğlu, Turkish-Danish footballer
 Oğuz Atay (1934–1977), pioneer of the modern novel in Turkey
 Oğuz Dağlaroğlu (born 1979), Turkish footballer
 Oğuz Savaş (born 1987), Turkish basketball player
 Oğuz Tansel (1915–1994), Turkish poet and folklorist
 Oğuz Tezmen, Turkish politician
 Oğuz Yılmaz (1968–2021), folk musician in Turkey
 Oghuz Khan, legendary khan of Turks, considered to be the ancestor of all Turks

Surname
 Candeğer Kılınçer Oğuz (born 1980), Turkish female high jumper
 Abdullah Oğuz (born 1958), Turkish director
 Cemal Oğuz, Turkish judoka
 Talat Oğuz, Turkish politician, member of national parliament
 Orhan Oğuz, Turkish politician, member of national parliament 
 Ilhan Oğuz, Turkish Bureaucrat
 Cemal Oğuz, Turkish Biologist Prof.

Turkish-language surnames
Turkish masculine given names